Aaliwala is a town and union council of Dera Ghazi Khan District in the Punjab province of Pakistan. It is located at 29°56'7N 70°40'26E and has an altitude of 113 metres (374 feet). Aali wala is belong to the Alyani leghari tribe, Alyani family have keep supremacy on this area from the 15th century. The Leghari Nawabs (Chiefs) belong to the Alyani clan of the Leghari tribe.

References

Populated places in Dera Ghazi Khan District
Union councils of Dera Ghazi Khan District
Towns in Punjab (Pakistan)